Finland-Swedish Sign Language (FinSSL) is a moribund sign language in Finland. It is now used only in private settings by older adults who attended the only Swedish school for the deaf in Finland (in Porvoo), which was established in the mid-19th century by Carl Oscar Malm but closed in 1993. Some 90 persons have it as their native language. FinSSL is said to be a distinct language; however, "Finland-Swedish Deaf have few problems understanding Finnish signers". There had been, moreover, continuous input from Swedish Sign Language over its history.

References

Further reading
 

Swedish Sign Language family
Sign languages in Finland